Murder in the Cathedral is a 1951 British drama film directed and produced by George Hoellering and co-written by Hoellering and T. S. Eliot based on Eliot's 1935 verse drama of the same name and starring Father John Groser.

The film competed at the 12th Venice International Film Festival and received the award for Best Production Design, given to Peter Pendrey. It was released in the United Kingdom in 1952.

Plot
Archbishop Thomas Becket (Father John Groser) deals with his temptations before his murder in the Canterbury Cathedral in 1170.

Differences from the play
A number of changes were made for the film. Three of them are particularly notable.

The fourth tempter is not seen; only a voice is heard, which was Eliot himself speaking the lines.

George Hoellering, the film's director, recognized that general audiences might not know the events that preceded the action of the play. He informed Eliot of this and asked for a new scene which depicted the central reasons leading to the events in the play. Eliot complied.

Hoellering also thought the knights' final speeches were a problem because "in stage productions these speeches amused the audience instead of shocking them, and thereby made them miss the point—the whole point of the play." He asked Eliot for changes; and Eliot made major reductions to the speeches and added a shorter speech.

Cast
 Father John Groser as Thomas Becket, Archbishop of Canterbury
 Alexander Gauge as King Henry II
 David Ward as First Tempter
 George Woodbridge as Second Tempter
 Basil Burton as Third Tempter
 T. S. Eliot as Voice of Fourth Tempter
 Donald Bisset as First Priest
 Clement McCallin as First Knight
 Michael Aldridge as Second Knight
 Leo McKern as Third Knight
 Paul Rogers as Fourth Knight
 Alban Blakelock as Bishop Foliot
 Niall MacGinnis as Herald

Release
Murder in the Cathedral premiered at the 12th Venice International Film Festival in 1951 before being theatrically released by Film Traders Ltd in the United Kingdom in March 1952 and in the United States by Classic Pictures on 25 March 1952.

Reception
Bosley Crowther wrote in The New York Times:

References

External links
 
 Cinema and Poetry: T. S. Eliot’s Murder in the Cathedral

1951 films
1950s biographical drama films
1950s historical drama films
British biographical drama films
British historical drama films
Adaptations of works by T. S. Eliot
Films about Catholic priests
Films about Catholicism
Films set in religious buildings and structures
British films based on plays
Films set in Kent
Films set in the 12th century
Cultural depictions of Thomas Becket
Martyrdom in fiction
1951 drama films
British black-and-white films
1950s English-language films
1950s British films